Crossflatts is a ribbon development in Airedale along the old route of the A650 road between Bingley and Keighley, in the Metropolitan Borough of Bradford, West Yorkshire, England.  The opening of the Aire Valley Trunk road in 2004 has seen a reduction  of 51% of traffic through the village.

It is served by Crossflatts railway station on the Airedale Line connecting Skipton with Bradford and Leeds. This small village adjoins Bingley at the famous Five Rise Locks.

Crossflatts is home to a number of local businesses, including The Royal Hotel (pub), Ryshworth Social Club, Crossflatts Cricket Club, Stuart Prices' butchers, as well as takeaway establishments, a chemist, a post office, a funeral parlour, a music shop and a church.

Crossflatts is also the home of UK Asset Resolution Ltd (UKAR), and Computershare, responsible for administering all remaining old NRAM and Bradford & Bingley mortgages in the UK.

Sports clubs 

Crossflatts has a crown green bowling club (Bingley Bowling Green Club Ltd, Slenningford) who play in the Worth Valley League and Aire-Wharfe League, two football clubs (Royal and Crossflatts) and a cricket club which plays in the Craven & District League.

Keighley Albion Juniors Rugby League club are based at Crossflatts Cricket Club.

Notable people 

Herman "Percy" Vear (1911–1983), professional boxer
Martin Whitcombe (1961), International Rugby Union player studied at Crossflatts Primary School
 Barry Watson (swimmer) (1939), Cross Channel swim record holder between 1964 & 1976, born and lives in Crossflatts

References

External links 

 

Geography of the City of Bradford
Villages in West Yorkshire